Michael von Albrecht (born 22 August 1933 in Stuttgart) is a German classical scholar and translator, as well as a poet writing in Latin.

Life
The son of the composer Georg Albrecht first attended the Music Academy in Stuttgart, where he graduated in 1955 after taking the state examination. In Tübingen and Paris, he then studied classical philology and Indology in 1959. In 1964, Albrecht was appointed professor of classical philology at the University of Heidelberg, where he remained until his retirement in 1998. He was also the Visiting Professor at the University of Amsterdam and a visiting member at the Institute for Advanced Study in Princeton in 1981.
Michael von Albrecht's research focuses on ancient music, Roman literature and its reception, history, and comparative literature. His two-volume history of Roman literature has been translated into eight languages. He has also become well known for translations of Latin literature into German, especially Virgil and Ovid.
In 1998 he received an honorary doctorate from the Aristotle University of Thessaloniki. For his translations of Latin, he was awarded  with the Johann Heinrich Voss Award for excellent translation in 2004.

Selected works 
 1964 Silius Italicus: Freiheit und Gebundenheit römischer Epik 
 1968 Ovid (Wege der Forschung; Mitherausgeber)
 1971 Meister römischer Prosa von Cato bis Apuleius
 1972 Goethe und das Volkslied
 1972 Der Teppich als literarisches Motiv
 1973 Marcus Tullius Cicero, Sprache und Stil
 1977 Römische Poesie
 1987 Die römische Literatur in Text und Darstellung (Hrsg. von Bd. 3)
 1988 Rom: Spiegel Europas. Texte und Themen (2. Auflage 1998)
 1989 Scripta Latina
 1992 Geschichte der römischen Literatur (2. Auflage 1994; Besprechung
 1999 Roman Epic. An Interpretative Introduction
 2000 Das Buch der Verwandlungen
 2000 Vergil, Eklogen
 2003 Literatur als Brücke : Studien zur Rezeptionsgeschichte und Komparatistik
 2004 Wort und Wandlung. Senecas Lebenskunst 
 2005 Lukrez in der europäischen Kultur
 2005 Bibliographie zum Fortwirken der Antike in den deutschsprachigen Literaturen des 19. und 20. Jahrhunderts (mit Walther Kißel und Werner Schubert)
 2006 'Vergil' .Bucolica, Georgica, Aeneis. Eine Einführung. Heidelberg, 2006.

References

External links
 Eulogy on the occasion of his 80th birthday (German)

1933 births
Writers from Stuttgart
German classical scholars
German translators
Living people
German male non-fiction writers
Translators of Virgil
20th-century Latin-language writers